The Brooks-Hughes House is a historic house in Phenix City, Alabama, U.S.. It was built from 1897 to 1904 as a cottage for W. T. Hall. It has been listed on the National Register of Historic Places since November 3, 1983.

References

Houses on the National Register of Historic Places in Alabama
Victorian architecture in Alabama
Houses completed in 1897
Houses in Russell County, Alabama
1897 establishments in Alabama